Richard Lee Winger (born August 27, 1943) is an American, political activist and analyst. He is the publisher and editor of Ballot Access News. He sits on the editorial board of the Election Law Journal. Winger publishes analysis, statistics and legal information and supports expanded access to the ballot for minor parties.

Overview
Winger is widely regarded as an expert on ballot access and election law, as well as on the topic of third parties in the United States. Though not a attorney, Winger periodically testifies in court cases and legislative hearings and is a source for both the media and political organizers. He has been published in The Wall Street Journal, Journal of Election Law, the Fordham Urban Law Review, American Review of Politics, California Journal and other publications. He has appeared as a commentator on ballot access on NBC, ABC, CNN, and NPR. Since 1985 Winger has published Ballot Access News,
 a monthly newsletter covering developments in ballot access law and among American minor parties generally.

Background
A lifelong Californian, Richard Winger graduated from the University of California, Berkeley as a Political Science major in 1966, and attended Graduate School in Political Science at UCLA.

Coalition on Free and Open Elections
In 1985 Winger co-founded, along with several minor party representatives, the Coalition on Free and Open Elections (COFOE). The group attempts to co-ordinate action and provide mutual support among the various minor parties for efforts to liberalize and reform ballot access laws.

Politics
Winger has been a member of the Libertarian Party for several years.

Winger has made one run for public office, a 1986 campaign for Secretary of State of California on the Libertarian ballot line. As he was running for the office charged with the administration of elections, the campaign was styled as being nonpartisan, intended to represent the interests of all minor parties. Winger finished fourth among five candidates with 1.5% of the vote.

References

External links
Ballot Access News
COFOE
 

1943 births
Living people
American bloggers
American online publication editors
American political activists
American political scientists
California Libertarians
Newsletter publishers (people)
United States federal election legislation
UC Berkeley College of Natural Resources alumni
University of California, Los Angeles alumni
Activists from California